The Chief of Air Force may refer to:

Chief of Air Force (Australia)
Chief of Air Force (Malaysia)
Chief of Air Force (New Zealand)
Chief of Air Force (Sweden)

See also
Chief of the Air Staff (disambiguation)